Roma have been living in Italy since the 15th century. The Sinti, who regard themselves as a subgroup distinct from the Roma, arrived from the north. Other Romani groups migrated from the Balkans and settled in Southern Italy and Central Italy.
From Bosnia and Kosovo, Muslim Roma the so called Xoraxane came to Italy at the time of the Balkan wars

Numbers
In 2015 in Italy there are at about 150,000 (70,000 Italian citizens) of Romani people origins. The three cities with most number of Romanis are: Rome, Milan and Naples.

Life in Italy
According to a May 2008 poll, 68% of Italians wanted to see all of the country's approximately 150,000 Gypsies, many of whom were Italian citizens, expelled. The survey, published as mobs in Naples burned down Gypsy camps that month, revealed that the majority also wanted all Gypsy camps in Italy to be demolished.

A 2015 poll conducted by Pew Research found that 86% of Italians have unfavourable views of Romani people.

In June 18 2018, Minister of the Interior Matteo Salvini announced the government would conduct a census of Romani people in Italy for the purpose of deporting all who are not in the country legally. However this measure was criticized as unconstitutional and was opposed by all the oppositions and also by some members of the M5S.

Romanis in Italy

 Agostino Cardamone (1965), boxer
 Moira Orfei (1931–2015), circus artist, actress
 Liana Orfei (1937), circus artist, actress
 Michele di Rocco (1982), professional boxer

See also
 Romani people in the Czech Republic
 Romani people in Turkey
 Romani people in Spain
 Romani people in Hungary

References 

Asian diaspora in Italy
Ethnic groups in Italy